What's Your Racket? is a 1934 American Pre-Code crime film directed by Fred Guiol and starring Regis Toomey, Noel Francis and J. Carrol Naish. It was produced on Poverty Row by independent studio Mayfair Pictures.

Synopsis
Mae Cosgrove, a nightclub hostess, carries out a robbery on the safe of a gangster's palatial home. The man she has robbed suspects another gang leader of ordering the job, leading to a dispute between them. In fact she is the daughter of a man framed for robbery by the gangs who is trying to gain enough evidence to free him.

Cast
 Regis Toomey as 	Bert Miller
 Noel Francis as Mae Cosgrove
 J. Carrol Naish as 	Dick Graves
 Creighton Hale as 	Chief
 Fred Malatesta as 	Benton
 May Wallace as 	Mrs. Cosgrove
 Lew Kelly as Cameron
 David Callis as Jones

References

Bibliography
 Pitts, Michael R. Poverty Row Studios, 1929–1940: An Illustrated History of 55 Independent Film Companies, with a Filmography for Each. McFarland & Company, 2005.

External links

1934 films
American crime films
1934 crime films
American black-and-white films
Films directed by Fred Guiol
Mayfair Pictures films
1930s English-language films
1930s American films